The Colombian white-faced capuchin (Cebus capucinus), also known as the Colombian white-headed capuchin or Colombian white-throated capuchin, is a medium-sized New World monkey of the family Cebidae, subfamily Cebinae. It is native to the extreme eastern portion of Panama and the extreme north-western portion of South America in western Colombia and northwestern Ecuador.

The Colombian white-faced capuchin was one of the many species originally described by Carl Linnaeus in his landmark 1758 10th edition of Systema Naturae. It is a member of the family Cebidae, the family of New World monkeys containing capuchin monkeys and squirrel monkeys. It is the type species for the genus Cebus, the genus that includes all the capuchin monkeys.

Until the 21st century the Panamanian white-faced capuchin, Cebus imitator, was considered conspecific with the Colombian white-faced capuchin, as the subspecies C. capucinus imitator. Some primatologists continue to consider the Panamanian and Colombian white-faced capuchins as a single species. In 2012 a study by Boubli, et al demonstrated that C. imitator and C. capucinus split up to 2 million years ago. Although the Panamanian white-faced capuchin is the most well-studied capuchin monkey species, as of 2014 there had been no field studies of the Colombian white-faced capuchin.

Two subspecies of Colombian white-faced capuchin are recognized:
 C. c. capucinus, from mainland South America and Panama
 C. c. curtus, from the Pacific island of Gorgona, sometimes referred to as the Gorgona white-faced capuchin.

Like other monkeys in the genus Cebus, the Colombian white-faced capuchin is named after the order of Capuchin friars because the cowls of these friars closely resemble the monkey's head coloration. The coloration is black on the body, tail, legs and the top of the head, with white chest, throat, face, shoulders and upper arms. C. c. curtus has a shorter tail.

The white-faced capuchin is found in the extreme north-western strip between the Pacific Ocean and the Andes Mountains in Colombia and northwestern Ecuador.

C. c. capucinus has been listed as endangered from a conservation standpoint by the IUCN, while C. c. curtus has been listed as vulnerable.

References

Capuchin monkeys
Mammals of Colombia
Mammals of Ecuador
Primates of Central America
Tool-using mammals
Mammals described in 1758
Primates of South America
Taxa named by Carl Linnaeus